Sebastian D'Souza (1906-1998) was a successful Goan music arranger in the Bollywood music industry, considered to be the master of fusing Indian music with European classical music concepts of harmony, cadence and obbligato. He is largely responsible for changing the entire harmonic structure of the Hindi film song to create an extremely listenable full body of sound behind the voice of the singer.

Sebastian was very competent in creating counter-melody which became popular from 1950 onwards and Sebastian became a well-known and the most wanted Music Arranger of many music directors of Hindi Film industry. Since 1951 till 1975, he was a permanent Assistant to Shankar–Jaikishan along with Datta Ram.

Bollywood career  

He started his career as a Music Arranger in 1948–49 with O. P. Nayyar. Sebastian's role got noticed during the making of Raj Kapoor's Aawara (1951).

Providing violin obbligato at the background, preparing counter melodies for the bass cello, use of choir techniques in employing voices in Indian chorus singing, sparing but significant use of sonorous church organ, refining cordial harmonies suitable for Indian composers could be noted as features of Sebastian's contribution to the Hindi film music

Arrangement discography

References

External links 
 
 http://www.dnaindia.com/lifestyle/salon-mera-naam-chin-chin-choo-1043062
 https://qz.com/407489/a-story-of-love-longing-and-jazz-in-1960s-bombay/
 http://www.frontline.in/static/html/fl2621/stories/20091023262107200.htm

1906 births
1996 deaths
20th-century Indian musicians
Indian music arrangers
Indian people of Portuguese descent
Musicians from Goa